is a Japanese company founded in 1948, originally to produce vacuum tubes. As time passed, production and elemental techniques of the vacuum tube transformed into the manufacturing of vacuum fluorescent displays (VFDs), tool and die set components, radio control equipment and OLED displays.

Company profile 
Futaba Corporation is divided into three business units — Electronic Components, Electronic Systems Division, and Machinery and Tooling Division.

 Electronics Component Division — VFD and OLED displays and capacitive touch panels
 Machinery and Tooling — Press and mold equipment and related components
 Electronic Systems Division — Radio control (RC) for both hobby and industrial applications and servomotors.

Remote control
Futaba became one of the first companies of its type to provide comprehensive radio control products, selection and service to hobbyists. Futaba systems and products were quickly accepted and used by serious competitors and casual enthusiasts alike.  Futaba products are used in the air, on the water, underwater and on the ground for all types of radio-controlled models. Futaba manufactures all components in-house, including tools and manufacturing facilities.

The hobby brand is distributed in North America by FutabaUSA, by Ripmax in the UK, Ireland, Germany and Austria, along with other distributors around the world.

Gallery

References

External links

Futaba official site 

Machine tool builders
Manufacturing companies of Japan
Defense companies of Japan
Multinational companies headquartered in Japan
Electronics companies established in 1948
Companies based in Chiba Prefecture
Companies listed on the Tokyo Stock Exchange
Japanese companies established in 1948
Japanese brands
Radio-controlled transmitter